Janis Ian (born Janis Eddy Fink; April 7, 1951) is an American singer-songwriter who was most commercially successful in the 1960s and 1970s. Her signature songs are the 1966/67 hit "Society's Child (Baby I've Been Thinking)" and the 1975 Top Ten single "At Seventeen", from her LP Between the Lines, which in September 1975 reached no. 1 on the Billboard album chart.

Born in Farmingdale, New Jersey, Ian entered the American folk music scene while still a teenager in the mid-1960s. Most active musically in that decade and the 1970s, she has continued recording into the 21st century. She has won two Grammy Awards, the first in 1975 for "At Seventeen" and the second in 2013 for Best Spoken Word Album, for her autobiography, Society's Child, with a total of ten nominations in eight different categories.

Ian is also a columnist and science fiction author.

Early life
Born in Farmingdale, New Jersey, Ian was raised on a farm, and attended East Orange High School in East Orange, New Jersey, and the New York City High School of Music & Art. Both sets of grandparents (from Kyiv, Ukraine; Tashkent, Uzbekistan; and Poland) lived in the New York-New Jersey area, having emigrated via England in about 1918. Her parents, Victor, a music teacher, and Pearl, a college fundraiser, were Jewish-born liberal atheists who ran several summer camps in upstate New York.

As a child, Ian admired the work of folk musicians such as Joan Baez and Odetta. Starting with piano lessons at the age of two (at her own insistence), Ian, by the time she entered her teens, was playing the organ, harmonica, French horn and guitar. At the age of 12, she wrote her first song, "Hair of Spun Gold", which was subsequently published in the folk publication Broadside and was later recorded for her eponymous debut album. In 1964, she legally changed her name to Janis Ian, taking her brother Eric's middle name as her new surname.

Music career
At the age of 14, Ian wrote and recorded her first hit single, "Society's Child (Baby I've Been Thinking)", about an interracial romance forbidden by a girl's mother and frowned upon by her peers and teachers. Produced by George "Shadow" Morton and released three times from 1965 to 1967, "Society's Child" became a national hit upon its third release after Leonard Bernstein featured it in a late-April 1967 CBS TV special titled Inside Pop: The Rock Revolution.

The song's theme of interracial relationships was considered taboo by some radio stations, who withdrew or banned it from their playlists accordingly. In her 2008 autobiography Society's Child, Ian recalls receiving hate mail and death threats as a response to the song and mentions that a radio station in Atlanta that played it was burned down. In July 1967, "Society's Child" reached no. 14 on the Billboard Hot 100. The single sold 600,000 copies and the album sold 350,000 copies.

At the age of 16, Ian met comedian Bill Cosby backstage at a Smothers Brothers show where she was promoting "Society's Child". Since she was underage, she was accompanied by a chaperone while touring. After her set, Ian had been sleeping with her head on the lap of her chaperone (an older female family friend). According to Ian in a 2015 interview, she was told by her then manager that Cosby had interpreted their interaction as "lesbian" and as a result "had made it his business" to warn other television shows that Ian wasn't "suitable family entertainment" and "shouldn't be on television" because of her sexuality, thus attempting to blacklist her. Although Ian would later come out, she states that at the time of the encounter with Cosby she had only been kissed once, by a boy she had a crush on, in broad daylight at summer camp.

Ian relates on her website that, although "Society's Child" was originally intended for Atlantic Records and the label paid for her recording session, Atlantic subsequently returned the master to her and quietly refused to release it. Ian relates that years later, Atlantic's president at the time, Jerry Wexler, publicly apologized to her for this. The single and Ian's 1967 debut album (which reached no. 29 on the charts) were finally released on Verve Forecast. In 2001, "Society's Child" was inducted into the Grammy Hall of Fame, which honors recordings considered timeless and important to music history. Her first four albums were released on a double CD entitled Society's Child: The Verve Recordings in 1995.

"Society's Child" stigmatized Ian as a one-hit wonder until her most successful US single, "At Seventeen", was released in 1975. "At Seventeen" is a bittersweet commentary on adolescent cruelty, the illusion of popularity and teenage angst, from the perspective of a narrator looking back on her earlier experience. The song was a major hit as it charted at no. 3 on the Billboard Hot 100, hit number one on the Adult Contemporary chart and won the 1976 Grammy Award for Best Pop Vocal Performance - Female, beating out Linda Ronstadt, Olivia Newton-John and Helen Reddy. Ian appeared as the first musical guest on the series premiere of Saturday Night Live on October 11, 1975, performing "At Seventeen" and "In the Winter". The album Between the Lines was also a smash and reached number one on Billboard′s album chart. The album would be certified platinum for sales of over one million copies sold in the US. Another measure of her success is anecdotal: on Valentine's Day 1977, Ian received 461 valentine cards, having indicated in the lyrics to "At Seventeen" that she never received one as a teenager.

"Fly Too High" (1979), produced by disco producer Giorgio Moroder, was Ian's contribution to the soundtrack of the Jodie Foster film Foxes and was also featured on Ian's 1979 album Night Rains. It also became another international hit, reaching number one in many countries, including South Africa, Belgium, Australia, Israel and the Netherlands, and going gold or platinum in those countries and others. Another country where Ian has achieved a high level of popularity is Japan: Ian had two Top 10 singles on the Japanese Oricon charts, "Love Is Blind" in 1976 and "You Are Love" in 1980. Ian's 1976 album Aftertones also topped Oricon's album chart in October 1976. "You Are Love (Toujours Gai Mon Cher)" is the theme song of Kinji Fukasaku's 1980 movie Virus. Ian cut several other singles specifically for the Japanese market, including 1998's "The Last Great Place".

In the US, Ian did not chart in the Top 40 on the pop charts after "At Seventeen", though she had several songs reach the Adult Contemporary singles chart through 1980 (all failing to make the Top 20).

Ian started Rude Girl Records, Inc., and its publishing arm, Rude Girl Publishing, on January 2, 1992. Since then, RGR has steadily grown, with its ownership of more than twenty-five Janis Ian albums and DVDs overseas, as well as hundreds of unreleased recordings and videos, including unreleased songs, concerts, demos, and rehearsal tapes. The Rude Girl label oversees the production of Ian's newer work, and in the case of older work, its re-mastering and the re-creation of the original artwork.

From 1982–92, Ian continued to write songs, often in collaboration with then songwriting partner Kye Fleming, some of which have been covered by Amy Grant, Bette Midler, Marti Jones and other artists. She released Breaking Silence in 1993 and also came out as a lesbian.

Other artists have recorded Ian's compositions, including Roberta Flack, who had a hit in 1973 with Ian's song "Jesse", which peaked at #19 on the Billboard pop charts on November 3, 1973. Ian's own version is included on her 1974 album Stars (the title song of which has also been oft-covered, including versions by Joan Baez, Shirley Bassey, Cher, Nina Simone and Barbara Cook). "At Seventeen" is Ian's most covered composition with 50 versions by artists including Celine Dion, Miki Howard and Julia Fordham. Ian's song "In The Winter" has also been covered many times by singers including Dusty Springfield and Sheena Easton. Richard Barone recorded Ian's song "Sweet Misery" on his album Sorrows & Promises: Greenwich Village in the 1960s in 2016. She continues to tour worldwide, though she stated that her 2022 North-American tour which was cancelled when a laryngitis diagnosis became severe would be her "last full tour".

In August 2018 Ian performed at the UK's Cambridge Folk Festival.

Criticism of the RIAA
Ian is an outspoken critic of the Recording Industry Association of America (RIAA), which she sees as acting against the interests of musicians and consumers. Consequently, she has released several of her songs for free download from her website. "I've been surprised at how few people are willing to get annoyed with me over it," she laughs. "There was a little backlash here and there. I was scheduled to appear on a panel somewhere and somebody from a record company said if I was there they would boycott it. But that's been pretty much it. In general, the entire reaction has been favorable. I hear from a lot of people in my industry who don't want to be quoted, but say 'yeah, we're aware of this and we'd like to see a change too.'" Along with science fiction authors Eric Flint and Cory Doctorow, she has argued that their experience provides conclusive evidence that free downloads dramatically increased hard-copy sales, contrary to the claims of RIAA and NARAS.

Writing and acting

Ian writes science fiction. A long-time reader of the genre, she became involved in science fiction fandom in 2001 by attending the Millennium Philcon. Her short stories have been published in anthologies and she co-edited, with Mike Resnick, the anthology Stars: Original Stories Based on the Songs of Janis Ian, published in 2003. She continues to occasionally attend science fiction conventions. Ian performed at the 2009 Nebula Award Conference in Los Angeles, where she sang "Welcome Home," a version of her song "At Seventeen" with the lyrics changed to talk about the acceptance she found by reading science fiction.

Ian was a regular columnist for the LGBT news magazine The Advocate and contributed to Performing Songwriter magazine from 1993 to 2006. On July 24, 2008, Ian released her positively-received autobiography Society's Child (published by Penguin Tarcher). An accompanying double CD, The Autobiography Collection, has been released with many of Ian's best loved songs.

Ian took acting lessons and script interpretation classes from Stella Adler in the early 1980s to help her feel more comfortable on stage, and she and Adler remained close friends until Adler's death in 1992. In December 2015, Ian appeared in the series finale of HBO comedy series Getting On playing a patient who refused to stop singing.

Personal life
Ian's mother Pearl Yadoff Fink was diagnosed with multiple sclerosis in 1975. Because of this, Ian and her brother persuaded their mother to pursue her lifelong dream of going to college. Fink eventually enrolled in Goddard College's adult education program and ultimately graduated with a master's degree. After Fink's death in 1997, Ian decided to auction off memorabilia to raise money to endow a scholarship at Goddard specifically for older continuing education students, which became the Pearl Foundation, a 501(c)(3) public charity. At the end of each year, 90% or more of funds raised from sale of merchandise, donations from fans and contributions from Ian herself are disbursed to various educational institutions to fund scholarships. By 2020, it had endowed more than $1,250,000 in scholarship funds at four schools.

Ian married Portuguese filmmaker Tino Sargo in 1978 and the two divorced in 1983. Accusations of Sargo's physical and emotional abuse were discussed in Ian's autobiography. After moving to Nashville, she met Patricia Snyder in 1989. Ian came out as a lesbian in 1993 with the worldwide release of her album Breaking Silence. Snyder and Ian married in Toronto on August 27, 2003. Ian has a stepdaughter and two grandchildren with Snyder.

Discography

Studio albums

Live albums
 Remember... (1978) (orig. JVC Japan, now Rude Girl)
 Live on the Test 1976 (1995) (BBC World Wide)
 The Bottom Line Encore Collection (1999) (Bottom Line Records)
 Live: Working Without a Net (2003) (Rude Girl)

Compilation albums

Singles

DVDs
 Janis Ian: Live From Grand Center (2008)
 Live at Club Cafe (2005) (Rude Girl)
 Janismania (2005) (Rude Girl)
 Through the Years: A Retrospective (2007) (Rude Girl)
 Janis Ian '79: Live in Japan & Australia (2008) (Rude Girl)

Bibliography
 Who Really Cares: Poems From Childhood and Early Youth, 1969 (2002 re-release), 
 Songbook, 1999, 
 Stars: Original Stories Based on the Songs of Janis Ian, 2003,  (ed., with Mike Resnick)
 "Prayerville", 2003, in Mike Resnick and Martin H. Greenberg (eds), Women Writing Science Fiction As Men, 
 Society's Child: My Autobiography, 2008, Tarcher/Penguin; ;

Notes

References

External links

 
 
 
 
 
Interview with Janis Ian in International Songwriters Association's "Songwriter Magazine"

1951 births
20th-century American women writers
21st-century American women writers
American acoustic guitarists
American autobiographers
American child singers
American columnists
American women singer-songwriters
American folk guitarists
American folk singers
American pop guitarists
American magazine writers
American memoirists
American science fiction writers
Atlantic Records artists
Grammy Award winners
Jewish American songwriters
Jewish American musicians
Jewish American writers
American lesbian musicians
American lesbian writers
Lesbian Jews
LGBT people from New Jersey
American LGBT singers
American LGBT songwriters
American LGBT poets
Lesbian singers
Lesbian songwriters
Lesbian poets
Living people
Musicians from East Orange, New Jersey
People from Farmingdale, New Jersey
Singer-songwriters from New Jersey
Writers from East Orange, New Jersey
American women memoirists
American women columnists
Women science fiction and fantasy writers
21st-century American poets
20th-century American poets
21st-century American short story writers
American women poets
American women short story writers
Jewish folk singers
Columbia Records artists
Verve Records artists
20th-century American women guitarists
20th-century American guitarists
21st-century American women guitarists
21st-century American guitarists
Guitarists from New Jersey
Writers from New Jersey
20th-century American non-fiction writers
21st-century American non-fiction writers
20th-century American LGBT people
21st-century American LGBT people
21st-century American Jews